The Spirits Dancing in the Flesh Tour was the twenty-fourth concert tour by Santana in 1990, supporting the Spirits Dancing in the Flesh album.

Tour band 
 Alex Ligertwood – lead vocals, rhythm guitar
 Carlos Santana – lead guitar, percussion, vocals
 Chester D. Thompson – keyboards
 Benny Rietveld – bass guitar
 Walfredo Reyes Jr. – drums
 Armando Peraza – congas, percussion (through October)
 Raul Rekow – congas, bongos, percussion, vocals (beginning October)

Set list 
The tour lasted from March 17 at the San Francisco Civic Auditorium in San Francisco, California to November 21 at the Bayfront Auditorium in Pensacola, Florida. An average set list of this tour was as follows:

 "Spirits Dancing in the Flesh" (Carlos Santana, Chester D. Thompson)
 "Somewhere in Heaven" (Alex Ligertwood, Santana)
 "It's a Jungle Out There" (Santana)
 "The Healer" (John Lee Hooker, Roy Rogers, Santana, Chester Thompson)
 "Batuka" (José Areas, David Brown, Michael Carabello, Gregg Rolie, Michael Shrieve)
 "No One to Depend On" (Carabello, Coke Escovedo, Rolie, Willie Bobo, Melvin Lastie)
 "We Don't Have to Wait" (Santana, Armando Peraza, Thompson)
 "Black Magic Woman" (Peter Green)
 "Gypsy Queen" (Gábor Szabó)
 "Oye Como Va" (Tito Puente)
 "Peace on Earth...Mother Earth...Third Stone from the Sun" (John Coltrane, Santana, Jimi Hendrix)
 "Mandela" (Peraza)
 "Savor" (Areas, Brown, Carabello, Rolie, Santana, Shrieve)
 "Choose" (Santana, Thompson, Ligertwood)
 "She's Not There" (Rod Argent)
 "Toussaint L'Overture" (Areas, Brown, Carabello, Rolie, Santana, Shrieve)
 "Europa (Earth's Cry Heaven's Smile)" (Tom Coster, Santana)
Encore
 "Soul Sacrifice" (Santana, Rolie, Brown, Marcus Malone)
 "Jin-go-lo-ba" (Babatunde Olatunji)

Tour dates

U.S. leg (March 17 – May 26)

European leg (May 29 – June 30)

North American leg (July 13 – November 21)

Box office score data

Notes

References

External links 
 Santana Past Shows 1990 at Santana official website

Santana (band) concert tours
1990 concert tours
Concert tours of North America
Concert tours of Europe